Egercsehi is a village in Heves County, Hungary. As of 2015, it has a population of 1,320, and 1,281 as of the 2021 estimate.

History
The earliest written record of the village dates back to 1285.

The jewish community
Jews lived in the village in the 18th and 19th centuries until 1944, when most of the Jews from the village were murdered in the Holocaust. In the area of the village, the Nazis concentrated many Jews from the area, including the Jews of the village of Kál and Pétervására.

Demographics
According the 2011 census, 82.3% of the population were of Hungarian ethnicity and 8.4% were Gypsies, 17.6% were undeclared, and 0.5% were German (due to dual identities, the total may be higher than 100%). The religious distribution was as follows: Roman Catholic 33%, Reformed 3.6%, Lutheran 0.4%, Greek Catholic 0.4%, non-denominational 26.8%, and 34.4% unknown.

Notable people

Born in Egercsehi
 Pál Medgyessy (1919–1977) mathematician

References

External links

 in Hungarian, English, German and Polish

Populated places in Heves County